The 2022 Sibiu Open was a professional tennis tournament played on clay courts. It was the eleventh edition of the tournament which was part of the 2022 ATP Challenger Tour. It took place in Sibiu, Romania between 19 and 25 September 2022.

Singles main-draw entrants

Seeds

 1 Rankings are as of 12 September 2022.

Other entrants
The following players received wildcards into the singles main draw:
  Marius Copil
  Victor Vlad Cornea
  Dragoș Dima

The following player received entry into the singles main draw using a protected ranking:
  Jan Choinski

The following players received entry from the qualifying draw:
  Steven Diez
  Giovanni Fonio
  Ivan Gakhov
  Georgii Kravchenko
  Rudolf Molleker
  Kai Wehnelt

Champions

Singles

 Nerman Fatić def.  Damir Džumhur 6–3, 6–4.

Doubles

 Ivan Sabanov /  Matej Sabanov def.  Alexander Erler /  Lucas Miedler 3–6, 7–5, [10–4].

References

2022 ATP Challenger Tour
2022
September 2022 sports events in Romania
2022 in Romanian sport